James Michael Pietrzak (February 21, 1953 – April 5, 2018) was an American football offensive lineman in the National Football League (NFL) for the New York Giants, New Orleans Saints, and the Kansas City Chiefs.  He played college football at Eastern Michigan University and was drafted in the sixth round of the 1974 NFL Draft. He played 140 games over 11 seasons from 1974 to 1987.

References

1953 births
University of Detroit Jesuit High School and Academy alumni
American football offensive tackles
American football centers
Eastern Michigan University alumni
Eastern Michigan Eagles football players
New York Giants players
New Orleans Saints players
Kansas City Chiefs players
Players of American football from Detroit